Private James MacKenzie VC (2 April 1889 − 19 December 1914) was a British Army soldier and a Scottish recipient of the Victoria Cross (VC), the highest and most prestigious award for gallantry in the face of the enemy that can be awarded to British and Commonwealth forces.

MacKenzie was born in New Abbey, Kirkcudbrightshire in 1889 and enlisted in the Scots Guards on 16 February 1912. He embarked for France on 5 October 1914.  He was 25 years old, and a private in the 2nd Battalion, Scots Guards, British Army during the First World War when the following deed took place for which he was awarded the VC.

On 19 December 1914 at Rouges Blancs, France, MacKenzie rescued a severely wounded man from the front of the German trenches under a very heavy fire and after a stretcher party had been compelled to abandon the attempt. MacKenzie was killed later on that day while trying to carry out a similar act.

Private MacKenzie has no known grave but his name is listed on panel 1 the Ploegsteert Memorial to the Missing in Berks Cemetery Extension near Ploegsteert in Hainaut, Belgium. There is a memorial tablet at Troqueer Parish Church, Maxwelltown.  His Victoria Cross is displayed at The Guards Regimental Headquarters (Scots Guards RHQ), London, England.

References

Monuments to Courage (David Harvey, 1999)
The Register of the Victoria Cross (This England, 1997)
Scotland's Forgotten Valour (Graham Ross, 1995)
VCs of the First World War - 1914 (Gerald Gliddon, 1994)

1889 births
1914 deaths
Scottish military personnel
British World War I recipients of the Victoria Cross
Scots Guards soldiers
British Army personnel of World War I
British military personnel killed in World War I
People from Dumfries and Galloway
British Army recipients of the Victoria Cross
Missing in action of World War I